The 1978 Nicholls State Colonels football team represented Nicholls State University as a member of the Gulf South Conference (GSC) the 1978 NCAA Division II football season. Led by fifth-year head coach Bill Clements, the Colonels compiled an overall record of 5–6 with a conference mark of 5–2, tying for third place in the GSC. Nicholls State played home games at John L. Guidry Stadium in Thibodaux, Louisiana.

Schedule

References

Nicholls State
Nicholls Colonels football seasons
Nicholls State Colonels football